Mah Navu Alei is a zemer in the Iraqi Jewish tradition. It was composed by Rabbi Shim'on ben Rabbi Nissim in the 19th century in Iraq, and gained widespread popularity among the Iraqi Jewish community. It is sung at most Iraqi simchas and events, in particular at weddings and sheva berachot. The zemer was brought to Israel, where it became part of the standard repertoire of Israeli Jewish music, popular with Jews of all backgrounds.

Lyrics 
מַה נָּאווּ עֲלֵי הֶהָרִים רַגְלֵי	 	מְבַשֵּׂר שָׁלוֹם בְּבִנְיַן עִירֵךְ

קוֹל צוֹפַיִך יִשְׂאוּ קוֹל רִנָּה	 	הִתְנַעֲרִי מִתּוֹךְ מְגִנָּה

עַיִן בְּעַיִן תִּרְאִי שְׁכִינָה	 	וְשָׁבוּ בָנַיִךְ לִגְבוּלֵךְ

לִשְׁבוּיִים דְּרוֹר בְּשִׁיר וּמִזְמוֹר	 	אֶל בֵּית הַר הַמּוֹר יְהִי שְׁבִילֵךְ

סֹלוּ סֹלוּ אֶת הַמְּסִלָּה	 	פִּצְחוּ רְנָנָה וּתְהִלָּה

יָבֹא מְבַשֵּׂר בִּלְשׁוֹנוֹ מִלָּה	 	קוּמִי עוּרִי כִּי בָא אוֹרֵךְ

צְאִי מִבָּבֶל קִרְיַת עוֹבְדֵי בֵל	 	כִּנּוֹר וָנֵבֶל אָז יְהִי שִׁירֵךְ

שׂוֹשׂ יָשִׂישׂוּ כָּל אֲבֵלֵי צִיּוֹן	 	לָבֹא לַחֲסוֹת בְּצֵל הָעֶלְיוֹן

בָּנֹה אֶבְנֶה לָךְ נְוֵה אַפִּרְיוֹן	 	אָכִין כִּסֵּא לְדָוִד מַלְכֵּךְ

שְׂאִי עֵינַיךְ וּרְאִי בָנַיִךְ	 	בָּאוּ אֵלַיִךְ לָאוֹר בְּאוֹרֵךְ

תַּחַת חֹשֶׁך אָשִׂים לָךְ אוֹרָה	 	אָז מִצִּיּוֹן תֵּצֵא הַתּוֹרָה

הִנֵּה גָדוֹל הוּא אָיֹם וְנוֹרָא	 	בְּיוֹם שִׂימִי כֶתֶר לְרֹאשֵׁךְ

עַד מָתַי כַּלָּה יָפָה וּמְעֻלָּה	 	לְזָּר בְּעוּלָה כְּדַל וָהֵלֶךְ

עוּרִי עוּרִי עֲדַת יִשְׂרָאֵל	 	אָחִישׁ אֶשְׁלַח יִנּוֹן וְגוֹאֵל

וגַם אָקִים לָךְ חוֹמַת אֲרִיאֵל	 	זָכֹר אֶזְכֹּר חֶסֶד נְעוּרֵךְ

References

External links 
 

Hebrew-language songs